Aechmea castelnavii is a plant species in the genus Aechmea. This species is native to Costa Rica and northern South America (Bolivia, Venezuela, Colombia, Peru and Brazil).

Cultivars
 × Neomea 'Barbara Ruskin'

References

castelnavii
Flora of South America
Flora of Costa Rica
Plants described in 1889
Taxa named by John Gilbert Baker